"I'm Gonna Be (500 Miles)" is a 1988 song by The Proclaimers.

I'm Gonna Be may also refer to:

 "I'm Gonna Be" (Donell Jones song), 2006
 "I'm Gonna Be", a 2019 song by Post Malone from Hollywood's Bleeding

See also